William Frederick Streeter (born July 14, 1937) is a retired United States Army major general who served as Commanding General, 1st Cavalry Division from 1988 to 1990. He also commanded the U.S. Army Military District of Washington, coordinating military participation in the bicentennial celebration for the U.S. Constitution in 1990 and the first inauguration of Bill Clinton in 1993.

Streeter graduated from Norwich University in 1959 with a B.S. degree in business administration. He later earned an M.S. degree in public administration from Shippensburg State College while also studying at the nearby Army War College. He retired from active duty in 1993.

References

1937 births
Living people
People from Greenfield, Massachusetts
Norwich University alumni
United States Army Rangers
United States Army personnel of the Vietnam War
Recipients of the Air Medal
Shippensburg University of Pennsylvania alumni
Recipients of the Meritorious Service Medal (United States)
Recipients of the Legion of Merit
United States Army generals
Recipients of the Distinguished Service Medal (US Army)
Military personnel from Massachusetts